The Sign of the Coyote (Italian: Il segno del coyote) is a 1963 Italian-Spanish western adventure film directed by Mario Caiano and starring Fernando Casanova, María Luz Galicia and Jesús Tordesillas.

The film's sets were designed by the art director Piero Filippone.

Synopsis
Following the Conquest of California, a local adventurer battles against the new American authorities and their unjust actions against the people.

Cast

References

Bibliography 
 Eugenio Ercolani. Darkening the Italian Screen: Interviews with Genre and Exploitation Directors Who Debuted in the 1950s and 1960s. McFarland, 2019.

External links 
 

1963 films
Spanish historical adventure films
Italian historical adventure films
Italian Western (genre) films
Spanish Western (genre) films
1963 Western (genre) films
1960s historical adventure films
1960s Italian-language films
Films directed by Mario Caiano
Films set in the 19th century
Films set in California
Spaghetti Western films
1960s Italian films